Sabaneta may refer to

Sabaneta, Antioquia, Colombia
Sabaneta, Dominican Republic
Sabaneta, Barinas, Venezuela

See also 
 Savaneta, Aruba
 Sabanetas (Ponce)
 Sabanetas (Mayagüez)